Moloch is a 2022 Dutch folk horror film directed by Nico van den Brink, starring Sallie Harmsen and Alexandre Willaume.

Plot
The film focuses on 38 year old Betriek (Sallie Harmsen), who lives with her family in a house on edge of a peat bog in north Netherlands. The family's relatively peaceful existence is shattered one day when a mysterious stranger attacks the house one night, setting off a string of unexplained events that Betriek attempts to unravel the mystery of the stranger. All the while, an ancient evil lurks deep within the bog.

Cast
 Sallie Harmsen as Betriek
 Alexandre Willaume as Jonas
 Anneke Blok as Elske
 Ad van Kempen as Ton
 Noor van der Velden as Hannah
  as Sonja
 Edon Rizvanolli as Radu
 Jack Wouterse as Hans
 Phi Nguyen as Lennard
 Willemijn Kressenhof as Dr. Mensinck
  as Roelof

Release
The film was released in theatres in the Netherlands on 19 May 2022.

Reception
On review aggregation website Rotten Tomatoes, the film has an approval rating of 88% based on 16 reviews. Kurt Halfyard of ScreenAnarchy called the film a "bonafide gem of a horror movie" and van den Brink a "filmmaker to keep a very close eye on." Kevin Toma of de Volkskrant rated the film 4 stars out of 5. Whang Yee Ling of The Straits Times rated the film 3 stars out of 5, calling it a "well-crafted exercise in dread" and wrote that van den Brink "turns an over-familiar tale into a uniquely local folk horror."

Roosje van der Kamp of filmkrant wrote a mixed review of the film. Jon Mendelsohn of Comic Book Resources wrote that while the film "plays with interesting ideas and spends time with its characters", it "can't seem to blend everything together into a concrete whole" and "final product is a bit unsatisfying."

References

External links
 
 

2022 films
2022 horror films
2020s supernatural horror films
Demons in popular culture
Dutch horror films
Folk horror films